The 6th General Assembly of Citizens was held between 9 and 15 January 2023, to renovate the leading bodies of the Citizens Party (Cs) and refound the party. On 21 June 2022, Inés Arrimadas called for a process of refoundation og the party following the succession of defeats in the Madrilenian, Castilian-Leonese and Andalusian elections where the party saw its representation drop to 0 or 1 seats. Following the conclusion of the refoundation, a bicephalous leadership was enforced separating in the positions of Secretary-General and Political Spokesperson.

On 26 December 2022, it was announced that the congress slogan would be "Radicalmente Libres". The leadership election saw the joint list formed by Patricia Guasp and Adrián Vázquez and supported by the outgoing president Inés Arrimadas win with 53.3% of the vote, thus defeating the candidacy of Edmundo Bal, who got 39.3% of the vote. A grassroot candidacy formed by Marcos Morales and Laura Alves managed to get 7.4% of the sare.

Candidates

Declined 

The individuals in this section were the subject of speculation about their possible candidacy, but publicly denied or recanted interest in running:
 Inés Arrimadas (age ) — President of Citizens (since 2020); Member of the Congress of Deputies for Barcelona (since 2019); Spokesperson of the Citizens Group in the Congress of Deputies (since 2019); Leader of the Opposition in the Parliament of Catalonia (2015–2019); Spokesperson of the Citizens Group in the Parliament of Catalonia (2015); Member of the Parliament of Catalonia for Barcelona (2012–2019).
 José Ramón Bauzá (age ) — Member of the European Parliament for Spain (since 2019); Senator in the Cortes Generales appointed by the Parliament of the Balearic Islands (2015–2019); Deputy in the Parliament of the Balearic Islands for Mallorca (2011–2015); President of the Balearic Islands (2011–2015); President of the PP of the Balearic Islands (2009–2015); Mayor of Marratxí (2005–2011); City Councillor of Marratxí (1999–2011); Vice President of the PP of the Balearic Islands (2007–2009); Deputy Mayor for Urbanism and Health of Marratxí (2003–2005).
 Jordi Cañas (age ) — Member of the European Parliament for Spain (since 2019); Member of the Parliament of Catalonia for Barcelona (2010–2014).
 Francisco Igea (age ) — Member of the Cortes of Castile and León for Valladolid (since 2019); Vice President of Castile and León (2019–2021); Minister of Transparency, Land Management and External Action of Castile and León (2019–2021); Spokesperson of Castile and León (2019–2021); Member of the Congress of Deputies for Valladolid (2016–2019).
 Begoña Villacís (age ) — Deputy Mayor of Madrid (since 2019); City Councillor of Madrid (since 2015).

Endorsements

Total
Candidates seeking to run were required to collect the endorsements of at least 1.5% of the total party members (115 endorsements).

Public endorsements

Edmundo Bal/Santiago Saura

Patricia Guasp/Adrián Vázquez

Campaign

Election debates

Opinion polls
Poll results are listed in the tables below in reverse chronological order, showing the most recent first, and using the date the survey's fieldwork was done, as opposed to the date of publication. If such date is unknown, the date of publication is given instead. The highest percentage figure in each polling survey is displayed in bold, and the background shaded in the candidate's colour. In the instance of a tie, the figures with the highest percentages are shaded. Polls show data gathered among Cs voters/supporters as well as Spanish voters as a whole, but not among party members, who are the ones ultimately entitled to vote in the primary election.

Cs voters

Spanish voters

Results

Notes

References 

Political party leadership elections in Spain
Citizens (Spanish political party) leadership election